The North Queensland Cowboys is an Australian professional rugby league football club based in Townsville, the largest town in North Queensland. They compete in Australia's premier rugby league competition, the National Rugby League (NRL).

Since their foundation in 1995, the club has appeared in three grand finals (2005, 2015 and 2017) winning in 2015, and has reached the finals ten times. The team's management headquarters and home ground, North Queensland Stadium, currently known as Queensland Country Bank Stadium due to sponsorship rights, are located in the suburb of South Townsville.

The Cowboys were admitted to the premiership for the 1995 ARL season. They played in the breakaway Super League competition in 1997 before continuing to compete in the re-unified National Rugby League competition the following year. After running into financial trouble in 2001, the club was taken over by News Limited. In 2007, the team was sold by News Limited to the Cowboys Leagues Club.

In 2015, the Cowboys played in the first all-Queensland Grand Final, defeating the Brisbane Broncos 17–16 in golden point to win their first premiership.

History

1995–1996: ARL

With the success of the Broncos in 1988, speculation intensified as to if the NSWRL would admit a new team based in North Queensland. In 1993, the NSWRL announced that North Queensland would enter the competition in 1995, along with three other new sides. One of the major difficulties that faced the club in their early years was attracting followers from the more established Queensland-based Winfield Cup side, the Brisbane Broncos. This was exacerbated by an initial lack of onfield success and stability. In their first two seasons, the Cowboys had eight different captains and finished last in their inaugural season.

1997: Super League

After much court action in 1995 and 1996, a ten team Super League competition was held in 1997. The Cowboys competed in this competition, and their squad was bolstered by a number of new signings including Ian Roberts and Steve Walters. However, they were unable to improve on the club's results in previous years, and for the second time in three seasons they were to finish the season in last place.

North Queensland's first game of the Super League season, a 24–16 win over new team the Adelaide Rams played on 1 March at Stockland Stadium in front of 17,738 fans was also the first ever game of the Super League's competition.

1998–1999: National Rugby League

In 1998 the Super League and Australian Rugby League competitions merged to form the National Rugby League (NRL). The Cowboys began their first season in this competition strongly, and after six rounds they were in equal first place. Although they fell away later in the season, they were to record the largest come-back to date in an Australian first grade rugby league match, defeating the Penrith Panthers 36–28 after trailing 26–0 at half-time. 1998 also saw the Cowboys record their largest loss to date, being defeated 62–0 by the North Sydney Bears in the last round of the home and away season.

The Cowboys signed their eleventh captain in 1999, Noel Goldthorpe. Paul Bowman was also to serve in that role during the season. Although their on-field performances were not spectacular, continuing high attendance figures saw aggregate attendances exceed one million spectators. This season the Cowboys also provided their first State of Origin representative when Paul Green was selected as Queensland's halfback for game 2 of the 1999 State of Origin series.

2000–2003: Improved results

In the years 2000 through to 2002 the Cowboys continued to struggle with off-field dramas and the struggles of coaches
and poor on-field performances. After finishing last in 2000, season 2001 began slowly. Tim Sheens resigned on 25 May and was replaced by his then assistant Murray Hurst. 4 straight losses in the opening rounds of 2002 led to Hurst being replaced early in the 2002 season, by former Illawarra Steelers and Leeds Rhinos coach Graham Murray. Murray stamped his authority and coaching prowess on the club and the NQ Cowboys looked far more competitive towards the end of the 2002 season. The Cowboys spent much of the 2003 season in the top eight with much improved performances from a host of players, including local talents Matt Bowen and Josh Hannay. The 2003 season ended with the Cowboys four points adrift of a top eight play-off position.

2004–2005: First time finalists and Grand Finalists

After a slow start to the season that saw them at 13th on the ladder with just one win and five losses, the Cowboys turned it around in the second half of the season to finish with 12 wins and 11 losses and 7th spot, giving the club their first ever top eight appearance.

The Cowboys fairytale year continued when they upset the 2nd place Canterbury away from home in the first week of the finals, 30–22, thanks largely to hat-trick hero Matt Sing. The following week the Cowboys defeated their state rivals the Brisbane Broncos at home, 10–0, in perhaps the club's most famous victory.

They ended up falling one game short of the grand final, losing to the Sydney Roosters, 19–16.

North Queensland would go one better in 2005, when they reached their first grand final in club history. With the help of new recruits Carl Webb and Johnathan Thurston, the side finished in 5th spot and with back-to-back finals appearances. They would ultimately lose the grand final to the Wests Tigers.

In his first year with the club, Johnathan Thurston won the Dally M Medal and made his State of Origin debut for Queensland.

2006–2007: Further improvement

In 2006, the Cowboys started the year with a 6-game winning streak and looked destined for another finals appearance, before ending the season with just 5 wins from 19 games and finishing in 9th position.

The 2007 season saw the Cowboys 3rd finals appearance and their first top 4 finish. They faced the Canterbury-Bankstown Bulldogs in Townsville in week 1 of the finals, scraping home by 2 points. The following week, they defeated the New Zealand Warriors at home by 37 points. They fell one game short of the grand final again, this time losing to Manly, 28–6. 2007 saw the retirement of club legend Paul Bowman, who took up a coaching role with the team in 2008.

Johnathan Thurston finished the year with his second Dally M Medal and Matt Bowen was named Dally M Fullback of the Year.

2008–2010: Struggling seasons

At the start of the 2008 season, the club announced head coach Graham Murray's contract would not be renewed. After only winning three of the first ten games, Murray resigned from his job and the club promoted assistant coach Ian Millward to the head coaching role for the rest of the year. During his stint as head coach, the club could only win two more games. Throughout the season the team were decimated by injuries and suspensions as well as off-field issues. In the end, the Cowboys finished 15th on the ladder avoiding the wooden spoon by for and against.

2009 saw the appointment of Neil Henry as head coach, who had won the Dally M Coach of the Year with the Canberra Raiders the previous year.  The club however experienced another disappointing season, finishing 12th with 11 wins and 13 losses.  2009 also saw Matthew Bowen score his 100th try, becoming the first North Queensland player to score 100 tries for the club and the debut of future Australian and New South Wales representative forward James Tamou.

The beginning out the 2010 season was marred with the speculation of whether Johnathan Thurston would renew his contract with the club. Thurston ended up re-signing for another three seasons, however it brought very little success.  The club finished 15th and would have received the wooden spoon if not for the Melbourne Storm salary cap scandal. 2010 saw the emergence of Scott Bolton and seeing the test debut of Matthew Scott. Jason Taumalolo became the Cowboys youngest ever debutant, making his debut against the Canterbury-Bankstown Bulldogs in round 24 aged 17 years and 82 days.

2011–2013: Return to the Finals

After missing the finals for the last 3 seasons the Cowboys underwent a major overhaul of personnel for the 2011 season. Club legend Ty Williams retired and they parted ways with club favourites Luke O'Donnell, Carl Webb and Steve Southern. Their biggest signing for the 2011 season was Queensland and Australian representative centre Brent Tate. They also made key recruits in the signings of former Melbourne Storm and Queensland State of Origin representative Dallas Johnson and premiership winner Glenn Hall from the English Super League, re-signing a former Cowboy in Gavin Cooper and picking up younger, experienced first graders such as Antonio Winterstein.

The Cowboys' new signings had a positive impact on the NRL team, with the Cowboys spending much of the year in the top four before a late slide dropped them to seventh position and giving them their first finals appearance since 2007. That year, they were the most watched NRL club on pay television, and their round four clash with the Parramatta Eels was the fourth most-watched sports event in Fox Sport's history.

2012 saw North Queensland return to the finals after finishing in 5th spot. They faced the Brisbane Broncos in the first week of the finals, winning 33–16, with halfback Michael Morgan scoring a hat trick. They lost the following week to Manly, in controversial circumstances. Club legend Aaron Payne retired at the end of the season, after ten years with the team.

North Queensland again made the finals in 2013, the first time the club had made the finals series three straight years, when they finished in 8th place. After a poor start to the season, the side went on a 6-game winning streak following the sacking of coach Neil Henry. They were eliminated in Week 1 of the finals, after a controversial loss to the Cronulla-Sutherland Sharks. Club legend Matthew Bowen played his last season in the NRL, announcing he would be taking up an offer with Super League side, the Wigan Warriors. Club stalwarts Ashley Graham and Dallas Johnson also announced their retirements.

On 1 October 2013, former North Queensland halfback Paul Green was announced as head coach for the 2014 and 2015 seasons, becoming the first former Cowboys player to coach the club.

2014–2017: A new era and the club's first premiership

The Cowboys started their 2014 season by winning the inaugural NRL Auckland Nines tournament which was held at Eden Park in Auckland. After losing key signing Lachlan Coote early in the tournament to injury, the Cowboys went on to face the Brisbane Broncos in the final, defeating them 16–7 to claim the trophy and a prize money cheque of $370,000.

After a difficult start to the season and a string of injuries to key players including internationals, the North Queensland club made a late charge to the finals finishing in fifth place and cementing a spot in the finals where they defeated the Brisbane Broncos, 32–20. They then travelled to Sydney to face the 2013 premiers the Sydney Roosters in the second week of the finals where they were defeated 31–30.

In 2015, North Queensland experienced their best ever regular season. They had a club record 11 game winning streak and finished with a club record 17 wins. In September, Johnathan Thurston won a record fourth Dally M Medal at the Dally M Awards.

On 26 September 2015, North Queensland qualified for their second grand final defeating the Melbourne Storm, 32–12. In the Grand Final, they defeated the Brisbane Broncos, 17–16. Thurston, who won the Clive Churchill Medal, kicked the winning field goal in golden point to win North Queensland's their first ever premiership.

On 21 February 2016, the club won their first World Club Challenge and were crowned the world's best club, defeating the Leeds Rhinos 38–4 at Headingley Rugby Stadium in Leeds, England. The club could not defend its premiership, finishing the 2016 NRL season in 4th place and falling one game short of the Grand Final, being eliminated by the Cronulla Sharks 32–20 at Allianz Stadium.

In 2017, despite losing co-captains Johnathan Thurston and Matthew Scott to season-ending injuries, the club qualified for their third Grand Final. Although they were just the second side to reach the Grand Final from 8th place, they would lose to the Melbourne Storm, who finished the regular season as minor premiers.

2018–2019: Departure of club legends

Before the 2018 season began, North Queensland were predicted by many to challenge for the premiership with the return of Matthew Scott and Johnathan Thurston from injury. Instead, they struggled to move away from the bottom of the ladder, going on two separate five-game losing streaks throughout the season. With two rounds to play, the club sat in last place. Two wins from their final two games saw them finish in 13th. The 2018 season would be the last for Thurston, who retired after 14 seasons, 294 games and one premiership for the club. In his final match, the Cowboys defeated the Titans 30–26.

Despite a poor 2018 and the loss of Thurston, many expected the Cowboys to return to the finals in 2019. What followed was another disappointing year in which the club finished 14th. Club legends Matthew Scott and Scott Bolton were farewelled at the end of the season. Both were members of the club's premiership winning side in 2015 and spent their entire NRL careers at the club. The club also played its final game at Willows Sports Complex, defeating the Canterbury-Bankstown Bulldogs 15–8.

2020–2022: Rebuilding seasons and finals return

Following two poor seasons in which they missed the finals, North Queensland looked to rebuild ahead of the 2020 NRL season. Their marquee signing was Australian and Queensland representative Valentine Holmes, who had spent 2019 playing for the New York Jets in the NFL. Holmes, a Townsville junior, signed a six-year deal with the club.

On 20 July 2020, after just three wins from their first 10 games, Paul Green announced his resignation from the club, with assistant coach Josh Hannay named as the interim head coach. On 4 September 2020, Todd Payten, a former assistant coach at the club, was announced as North Queensland's head coach on a three-year deal, starting in 2021.

Under Payten, the Cowboys endured another disappointing season, finishing 15th with seven wins.

In 2022, the club returned to the finals series after four seasons, finishing the regular season in third and equalling a club record of 17 regular season wins. They ultimately fell just one game short of the Grand Final, with Todd Payten later named the Dally M Coach of the Year.

Season summaries

Head-to-head records

Players

2023 NRL Squad

Notable players

Since 1995, the Cowboys have supplied numerous players to state and international representative sides.

10th anniversary team
In 2004, the Cowboys conducted a poll asking fans to vote on the best players to have worn Cowboy colours. After polling had finished the club released the overall best team to celebrate the team's 10th anniversary.

20th anniversary team
In 2015, the Cowboys celebrated their 20th anniversary and named a 20-year team at their anniversary dinner. The team was selected from a panel consisting of four former Cowboys coaches: Grant Bell, Neil Henry, Murray Hurst and Tim Sheens, and then-current coach Paul Green.

25th anniversary team
In 2020, the Cowboys celebrated their 25th anniversary and announced a 25-year team at their anniversary dinner, voted on by fans of the club. A number of players selected five years earlier were again in the side, with Kyle Feldt, Michael Morgan and Jason Taumalolo the new additions. John Asiata was selected as the club's best utility player.

Cowboys Hall of Fame
In 2015, the Cowboys launched their official Hall of Fame during their 20th anniversary celebrations. The foundation criteria were that any players considered had to have played at least 100 NRL games for the club and that they had to have been retired for at least two years. The inductees were decided by a specially selected panel, including members of the Cowboys' organisation and the wider rugby league community, and are assessed on their skill and ability, leadership, integrity and character, their state and international honours, and awards won at the club.

In 2019, Matthew Bowen was inducted into the Hall of Fame at the club's 2019 season launch event.

Coaches
The Cowboys' current coach, Todd Payten took over as head coach of the side from 2021, becoming the club's tenth and incumbent coach.

Honours

At the end of each season the North Queensland Cowboys hold their Presentation Ball, in which they present (among other awards) the Paul Bowman Medal for Cowboy of the Year. The player of the year award, which was named after Bowman in 2007, is awarded to Cowboys player voted as the best and fairest over the premiership season. After each match, the coaching staff award three votes to the best Cowboys player on ground, two votes to the second best, and one vote to the third best, similar to the Dally M Medal voting system.

The most recent Paul Bowman Medal winner is Jason Taumalolo, who won the award for the first time in 2016 and is the first player to win the award four consecutive times. Bowman himself is a two-time winner of the award (1999, 2000), as is Luke O'Donnell (2004, 2009), Aaron Payne (2006, 2008) and Matt Scott (2010, 2013), while Johnathan Thurston, was the first player to win the award four times (2005, 2012, 2014, 2015). The first recipient of the medal was Wayne Sing in 1995.

In 2014, the Cowboys won their first major trophy, the inaugural NRL Auckland Nines tournament which was held at Eden Park in Auckland, defeating the Brisbane Broncos 16–7 in the final. A year later the Cowboys won their first NRL premiership, defeating the Broncos 17–16 in golden point extra time. Johnathan Thurston was awarded the Clive Churchill Medal.

In 2020, the Cowboys won the NRL Nines for the second time, becoming the first club to do so. They defeated the St George Illawarra Dragons 23–14 in the final with Scott Drinkwater being named the Player of the Tournament.

Statistics and records

After a 10-year finals drought, the Cowboys made their first finals appearance in 2004, finishing one game away from the grand final. The following year the team played in their first grand final, losing to the Wests Tigers. The North Queensland club's second appearance in the grand final would not come for another 10 years, when they met Queensland rivals, Brisbane Broncos, in the 2015 decider. In one of the most entertaining grand finals in living memory, Johnathan Thurston kicked a golden-point field goal to win the Cowboys their maiden premiership.

The club's Under 20s side finished runners-up in the 2011 NYC grand final to the New Zealand Warriors while their feeder teams have won the Queensland Cup four times. In 2005 with the North Queensland Young Guns, 2010 and 2014 with the Northern Pride and 2013 with the Mackay Cutters.

Fullback Matthew Bowen currently holds the record for most first grade games and most tries for club. Bowen also holds the club record for most tries in a season, with 22 in 2007. Paul Bowman became the first Cowboy to play 200 first grade games in 2007.  Johnathan Thurston jointly holds the record for most points in a match with Josh Hannay at 24. Hannay's 10 goals against South Sydney in 2003. Johnathan Thurston currently holds the most points in a season in 2014 with 234 points. Winger Ray Mercy was the first, and so far only, Cowboy to score four tries in a match, which he did against Balmain in 1998.

The club's biggest winning margin is 58 points, achieved in 2014 in a 64–6 victory over the Wests Tigers. Their heaviest defeat is a 62–0 loss by the Parramatta Eels in 2001.

Stadium

From 1995 to 2019, the Cowboys played their home games at Willows Sports Complex, located in the Townsville suburb of Kirwan. Prior to 1995, the venue hosted trotting paceway nights, and was the main pacing venue for the Townsville District, but due to the admittance of the Cowboys, the venue was turned into a rugby league stadium.

The venue was renamed Stockland Stadium in 1995, due to sponsorship rights, and attracted a crowd of 23,156 to the Cowboys first ever premiership game. In 1998, the name was changed to Malanda Stadium by new sponsors Dairy Farmers, before being renamed again in 1999 to Dairy Farmers Stadium. The stadium underwent major renovations in 2005 and 2006, with the eastern, northern and southern grandstands receiving upgrades, the addition of more corporate boxes and a new replay screen and public address system installed. Dairy Farmers 15-year partnership with the Cowboys ended at the end of 2012 season, as the club looked for a new naming rights sponsor for the stadium.

In 2013, the stadium was renamed 1300SMILES Stadium, after the Townsville-based dental practice entered into a five-year sponsorship deal with Stadiums Queensland. On 29 August 2019, the club played their final game at the stadium, defeating the Canterbury Bulldogs 15–8.

The club record attendance for a regular season match is 30,302, set against the Brisbane Broncos in the round 8 of the 1999 season. The record attendance for a finals match is 24,989, set against the Brisbane Broncos in week 2 of the 2004 finals series.

In 2020, the club moved to the new 25,000-seat Queensland Country Bank Stadium in South Townsville.

Emblems and colours

Before becoming the Cowboys, the team names Marlins, Stingrays and the very popular Crocodiles were tossed up as potential team logos for the side, before public consultation resulted in the name 'Cowboys' (the Crocodiles name would eventually go to Townsville's National Basketball League team, who changed their name to the Townsville Crocodiles in 1998 after a dispute with the NBA's Phoenix Suns over their original name, the Townsville Suns). The colours navy blue and yellow were chosen to reflect the colours of the Townsville representative sides. Grey was also added as primary colour with white introduced as a secondary colour.

Logos

The club's "steer head" logo has stayed basically the same since 1995. In the early years the logo was on a white rectangular background, before being backed with a yellow oval. In 2003 the font was changed and a yellow star added, which remain to this day. A lighter shade of navy blue and white were also added to the logo. In 2020, the club introduced a new logo to celebrate their 25th season.

Primary Jerseys

The Cowboys' home jerseys have stayed predominantly navy blue over the years, with white, grey and yellow all being the predominant secondary colour at some stage, with the away jerseys predominantly white. Since 2011, the club has also worn special jerseys for Women in League round, Indigenous round and an Anzac/Defence force-themed jersey for games played on Anzac weekend.

Sponsors

Supporters
In 2018, the Cowboys recorded their largest ever membership tally, with 23,437, beating the record set the previous year of 22,278. In 2020, the Cowboys membership ambassador is Kyle Feldt.

Average regular season attendance

 1995: 21,670
 1996: 19,366
 1997: 17,539
 1998: 17,034
 1999: 16,108
 2000: 15,511
 2001: 13,738
 2002: 12,133
 2003: 14,892
 2004: 17,334
 2005: 20,590
 2006: 19,861
 2007: 20,508
 2008: 18,102

 2009: 17,309
 2010: 14,256
 2011: 14,189
 2012: 14,637
 2013: 14,112
 2014: 14,613
 2015: 16,230
 2016: 16,692
 2017: 16,512
 2018: 15,417
 2019: 13,658
 2020: 6,712
 2021: 14,472
 2022: 18,376

Notable supporters
Notable supporters of this club, amongst others, include:

Andy The Kid, musician
Nathan Burgers, professional field hockey player
Alicia Coutts, Olympic gold medal winning swimmer
Luke Feldman, Australian cricketer
Rachael Finch, former Miss Universe Australia
Mike Goldman, television & radio personality
James Hopes, Australian international cricketer
Mitchell Johnson, Australian international cricketer
Roz Kelly, Channel 9 reporter
Lee Kernaghan, country music artist

Jessica Mauboy, singer/actress
Anna Meares, Olympic gold medal winning cyclist
Jack Miller, Australian Grand Prix motorcycle racer
Morne Morkel, South African cricketer
Ryan Phelan, Channel 7 reporter
Robert Rose, former NBL basketballer
Jessicah Schipper, Australian swimmer
Melanie Schlanger, Olympic gold medal winning swimmer
Karrie Webb, Australia's most successful female professional golfer
Chris Wright, Olympic swimmer

Feeder clubs
 Mackay Cutters – based in Mackay, Queensland
 Northern Pride – based in Cairns, Queensland
 Townsville Blackhawks – based in Townsville, Queensland

The Cowboys players who do not make the NRL side train and play with feeder club in the Queensland Cup. These teams, based in the northern Queensland cities of Cairns, Mackay and Townsville, are separate entities but are affiliated with the Cowboys.

From the 2023 NRL season, the club changed the affiliation agreement with the Queensland Cup teams, with the Cowboys sending all NRL contracted players not selected in the weekly squad to just the Townsville Blackhawks.

Rivalries

North Queensland's main rivals are the Brisbane Broncos. From 1999 to 2006, the two clubs were the only Queensland-based sides in the NRL. A one-side rivalry for nearly 10 years, the Brisbane side had not lost to North Queensland in 16 encounters. In 2004, the teams met in the finals for the first time, with North Queensland defeating Brisbane 10–0, to record their first win in the derby.

In the final round of the 2020 NRL season, North Queensland condemned Brisbane to their first ever Wooden Spoon.  Brisbane needed to win the match to overtake Canterbury-Bankstown but lost the match.  As of 2020, the sides have met five more times in the finals, including the 2015 NRL Grand Final, the first all-Queensland Grand Final, which North Queensland won 17–16 in extra time. The rivalry between the two clubs is considered one of the best in modern rugby league.

The club had a minor competitive rivalry with the Cronulla-Sutherland Sharks The games with Cronulla grew from finals football, with the two clubs meeting five times in the finals since 2013.

Women's team
On 10 September 2019, the club announced the opening of their Women's Academy, providing a pathway to elite rugby league for females in north Queensland, with the aim to eventually get a team in the NRLW. The first four Academy members announced were Romy Teitzel, Riutoto Te Hiko, Shanaye Watson and Jasmine Peters.

On 17 December 2019, the Cowboys announced their first women's team, the North Queensland Gold Stars, who competed in the QRL Women's Premiership. In 2022, they won the premiership, defeating the Central Queensland Capras in the Grand Final.

On 15 June 2022, the Cowboys were admitted to the NRL Women's Premiership for the 2023 season. Following the announcement of the NRLW side, the Gold Stars were replaced in the QRL Women's Premiership by a Mackay Cutters women's side.

On 24 November 2022, Ben Jeffries was announced as the club's inaugural NRLW head coach, with Anita Creenaune appointed as Head of Women's Elite Programs.

Corporate

References

External links

Official Sites
 Cowboys Official Website
 Cowboys Leagues Club

Statistics & Information Sites
 Rugby League Tables
 Cowboys History 
Supporter Sites
 Cowboys Stampede – North Queensland Cowboys Fan Discussion Forum
 Cowboys Sub-Reddit

 
Rugby clubs established in 1995
National Rugby League clubs
Sport in Townsville
Rugby league teams in Queensland
NRL Women's Premiership clubs